Forest Laboratories was a company in the pharmaceutical industry incorporated in Delaware, with its principal office in New York City. It was known for licensing European pharmaceuticals for sale in the United States. On July 1, 2014, the company was acquired by Actavis (now Allergan).

History
The company was founded by Hans Lowey in 1956 as a small laboratory service company.

In 1967, the company became a public company via an initial public offering.

Ten years later, Howard Solomon became the chief executive officer of the company.

In 1984, the company acquired O'Neal Jones & Feldman for $8.8 million after a federal investigation resulted in one of its drugs being recalled.

On July 17, 1998, the company received approval from the Food and Drug Administration for Celexa (Citalopram), an antidepressant.

In 2000, the company cut ties with Warner-Lambert for the marketing of Celexa after Warner-Lambert was acquired by Pfizer.

On August 16, 2002, the company received approval from the Food and Drug Administration for Lexapro (Escitalopram), an updated version of Celexa.

In 2013, Solomon retired as chief executive officer of the company.

In February 2014, the company acquired Aptalis for $2.9 billion.

On July 1, 2014, the company was acquired by Actavis (now Allergan). The sale of the company came after pressure from Carl Icahn, the largest shareholder.

Products
Some of the products Forest Laboratories marketed with its partners included:

 AeroBid (flunisolide inhaler) for allergic rhinitis
 Armour Thyroid (desiccated thyroid extract tablets) for hypothyroidism and pituitary Thyroid-stimulating hormone suppression
 Bystolic (nebivolol) for hypertension
 Campral (acamprosate) for maintenance of abstinence from alcohol in patients with alcohol dependence
 Celexa (citalopram) for depression (developed by Lundbeck)
 Cervidil (dinoprostone vaginal insert) for the initiation and/or continuation of cervical ripening in certain patients
 Combunox (oxycodone/ibuprofen) for the short-term management of acute moderate-to-severe pain
 Daliresp (roflumilast) for reduction of COPD exacerbations in patients with severe COPD
 Fetzima (levomilnacipran extended release) for depression
 Lexapro (escitalopram) for depression and generalized anxiety disorder (developed in cooperation with Lundbeck)
 Levothroid (levothyroxine) for hypothyroidism and pituitary TSH suppression
 Linzess (linaclotide) for constipation-predominant irritable bowel syndrome and functional constipation
 Monurol (fosfomycin) for certain urinary tract infections
 Namenda and Namenda XR (memantine) for moderate-to-severe Alzheimer's disease
 Savella (milnacipran) for fibromyalgia
 Sudocrem medicated cream for irritant diaper dermatitis
 Teflaro (ceftaroline fosamil) for acute bacterial skin and skin structure infections and community-acquired pneumonia caused by susceptible bacteria
 Tiazac (diltiazem hydrochloride) for hypertension and chronic stable angina pectoris
 Thyrolar (liotrix) for hypothyroidism and pituitary TSH suppression
 Tudorza Pressair (aclidinium bromide inhalation powder) for COPD
 Viibryd (vilazodone) for depression

Controversies

Illegal distribution and promotion of medicines
In September 2010, the company agreed to pay $313 million to resolve allegations of civil and criminal liability relating to felony, obstruction of justice, and the illegal distribution and promotion of pharmaceuticals, charges to which it pled guilty. One of the pharmaceutical-related charges was a misdemeanor charge of illegally promoting the Celexa and Lexapro for unapproved uses in treating pediatric depression. The other drug-related charge was a misdemeanor charge of distributing the unapproved drug Levothroid in violation of the Federal Food, Drug, and Cosmetic Act. Certain of the criminal activities were revealed with the help of whistleblowers, who received $14 million from the settlement.

Forest Laboratories has been accused of using unlawful deals to prevent generic versions of its Alzheimer’s disease drug Namenda from entering the market.

Tax avoidance via transfer pricing
In 2010, the company was criticized for legally moving its profits offshore via transfer pricing.

Notes

Pharmaceutical companies established in 1956
Defunct pharmaceutical companies of the United States
Defunct companies based in New York City
Companies formerly listed on the New York Stock Exchange
1960s initial public offerings
2014 mergers and acquisitions
Pharmaceutical companies disestablished in 2014